Chinese Argentines are Argentine citizens of Chinese ancestry or Chinese-born immigrants. The Chinese Argentine community is one of the fastest-growing communities in Argentina. As of 2018, the community was made up of 200,000 people.

History
Since the 20th century, the Chinese in Argentina came in three waves. The first wave of immigrants came from small coastal towns between 1914–1949. The second wave of immigrants arrived from Taiwan in the 1980s and over the years, they have become accustomed to the porteño lifestyle. A considerable number of people from Hong Kong and the southern coastal region of China immigrated during the second wave. The third wave came in the 1990s, hailing mostly from China, mostly from the less developed province of Fujian. This group is filled with young drifters who came often through the illegal smuggling route originating in China's Fujian Province. However, many of the small supermarkets that are present in many neighbourhoods of Buenos Aires come from the community present during the third wave of immigration. 

Recently, there has been a fourth and newer wave of Chinese immigration who are mostly ambitious and educated members of China’s growing middle-class who are looking to find their place in China’s growing economy. Young employees of Chinese companies have recently arrived to work for at least two years. Today, many Chinese Argentines usually run supermercados chinos (Chinese supermarkets), which dominate the second tier of grocery stores in Buenos Aires. Tintorerías (Dry Cleaners) for laundry are also a common Chinese-run business.

Discrimination
Since the Argentine economic crisis, many small Chinese-owned businesses have faced significant crime. Robberies are frequent, with one Chinese supermarket reportedly robbed up to 14 times in one year, and stories of family members shot at gunpoint in their store are not uncommon. Tensions have arisen with other immigrant groups as well.

In June 2006, the union of truck drivers began a boycott of Chinese-owned stores. This was due to an alleged gun-related incident between a driver and a store owner, which involved illegal firearms. Shortages in stores were reported due to a lack of deliveries until the boycott was officially lifted the following month.

Buenos Aires' Chinatown

Buenos Aires' Chinatown is a largely commercial section five blocks long and two blocks wide in the barrio of Belgrano, Buenos Aires. This neighborhood contains several Chinese restaurants, grocery stores, and a Buddhist temple. It is the heart of the Chinese community in Argentina. The neighborhood began to develop in the 1980s when newly arrived Taiwanese and Chinese immigrants settled in this area. The neighborhood is also known for its Chinese New Year celebrations.

Religion
Tzong Kuan Temple was founded in 1988 by Master Pu Hsien with the support of Buddhist community in Taiwan, the temple is located in the Belgrano area on Montañeses 2175 Street and has a congregation of five hundred members. The current abbot is Master Zhi Han and the temple is also affiliated to Chinese Buddhist Association in Argentina and Bodhiyana Foundation.

Fo Guang Shan Order from Taiwan also has a branch temple, "Templo Budista Fo Guang Shan" in Argentina since 1992, and the temple offered courses in meditation, martial arts, yoga and hosts vegetarian cooking workshops on regular basis.

Notable Chinese-Argentines
Liu Song, table tennis player. Pan American Gold Medalist.
Ignacio Huang, film actor.
Fernando Juan Yuan Ping, businessman, entrepreneur, politician.

See also

 Argentina–China relations
 Asian Argentines
 Overseas Chinese

References

Asian Argentine
Ethnic groups in Argentina
Argentina
Chinese diaspora in South America
Chinese Latin American